Ringmore is a village and a civil parish located on the coast of Devon, England.The population taken at the 2011 census was 208.

History
Ringmore was first mentioned in the Domesday Book, in which it was referred to as "Reimore". Until 1908, there was a manor (or estate) located in Ringmore. Due to the absence of a lord in the manor, there are no official written records of the past of the village.

The small sandy bay located at the coast was once Ringmore's "port". From here the boats departed that went fishing for pilchards and to rescue seafarers wrecked on the rocks near Burgh Island.

Description
Ringmore is a village on the coast of Devon, England, at the head of a valley. From the village one can see Bigbury Bay and Aymore Cove. Within it are two 13th-century buildings, namely its Church of All Hallows and The Journey's End inn, previously known as The New Inn. The church of All Hallows is early English in style (13th-century); the tower with its spire is also of that date and stands to the south of the nave. The nave, chancel and two transepts have plain lancets without any tracery. Some of the windows have been renewed.

Most of its land is owned by the National Trust, and a large part of the village is designated as a Conservation Area. By common consent there is no street lighting and there is, from 2017, a mobile phone mast near the village (close to St Anne’s Chapel).

Location
Ringmore lies within the local government district of South Hams, wedged between Kingston to the west and Bigbury to the east. On the south it borders the sea.

Notes

References
Ringmore.info, the village's website.

Villages in South Hams
Civil parishes in South Hams